Kichi may refer to:

Places in Iran
Variously spelled Kichi, Ki Chi or Keychi:
 Keychi, Isfahan
 Kichi, Jabal, Isfahan County

Other
 José María González Santos (born 1975), Spanish politician nicknamed "Kichi"
 Kichi (footballer) (born 1985), Mexican footballer
 Kichi language, Bantu language of Tanzania
 Kichi ("blessing"), a possible fortune on an o-mikuji

See also
 
 Kiichi!!, a manga series by Hideki Arai
 Kiichi Miyazawa (1919–2007), Japanese politician